The Blacky Foster House in the vicinity of Shoup, Idaho was built in about 1930.  It has also been known as Smith Gulch Cabin and as Johnny Briggs Cabin.  It was listed on the National Register of Historic Places in 1992.

The cabin is located within the Frank Church-River of No Return Wilderness. It is accessible only by pack trail or by river.

It is a single-room log cabin with a gable roof, built of peeled logs.

References

Houses on the National Register of Historic Places in Idaho
Houses completed in 1930
Idaho County, Idaho
Log cabins